Tangzhou or Tang Prefecture, briefly known as Bizhou or Bi Prefecture from 906 to the late 940s, was a zhou (prefecture) in imperial China seated in modern Tanghe County in Henan, China. It existed (intermittently) from 626 to 1380.

Geography
The administrative region of Tangzhou in the Tang dynasty is in southern Henan. It probably includes parts of modern: 
Under the administration of Nanyang:
Tanghe County
Tongbai County
Sheqi County
Fangcheng County
Under the administration of Zhumadian:
Biyang County

See also
Huai'an Commandery

References
 

Prefectures of the Tang dynasty
Prefectures of the Song dynasty
Prefectures of the Jin dynasty (1115–1234)
Prefectures of Later Liang (Five Dynasties)
Prefectures of Later Han (Five Dynasties)
Prefectures of Later Jin (Five Dynasties)
Prefectures of Later Tang
Prefectures of Later Zhou
Former prefectures in Henan
Prefectures of the Yuan dynasty
Subprefectures of the Ming dynasty